is a Japanese composer from Osaka.

Biography
Nishimura studied composition and musical theory on a graduate course at Tokyo National University of Fine Arts and Music. He also studied Asian traditional music, religion, aesthetics, cosmology and the heterophonic concepts, all of which have a lasting influence on his music.

He has won several national and international awards, including the 36th Suntory Music Award (2004) and has been commissioned by many overseas music festivals.

Nishimura was the judge at the 2007 Toru Takemitsu composition award.

Works

Operas
Asters (premiered February 2019)

Other works
Mantra of the Light, for female choir and orchestra

Other activities
Tokyo College of Music: professor (composition)

See also
 Music of Japan

References

External links
 Zen-On Contemporary Composers - Akira Nishimura – Biography, works and discography
 A Nishimura Profile
 Toru Takemitsu Composition Award homepage

1953 births
Concert band composers
International Rostrum of Composers prize-winners
Japanese classical composers
Japanese male classical composers
Japanese opera composers
Living people
Male opera composers
Musicians from Osaka
Recipients of the Medal with Purple Ribbon
Prize-winners of the Queen Elisabeth Competition